Juana Rosa Pita (n. Padrón) is a poet, writer, editor and translator. She was born in Havana on December 8, 1939. She left Cuba in 1961. Since then she has lived in many cities, including Washington, Caracas, Madrid, New Orleans, Miami, and Boston, where she currently resides. From 1989 to 1992 she was Visiting Professor at Tulane University. She is considered one of the most important contemporary Cuban and Latin American poets. The late Nicaraguan poet Pablo Antonio Cuadra hailed her as "one of the outstanding voices of Cuba’s pilgrim culture. Book after book Juana Rosa Pita has been creating a mysterious realm of love and prophecy: an island of enchantment where words restore all that hatred turned to ashes."

Example 

Her ars poetica can be illustrated in a grain of poetry, using her words, a sip of light:

Poetry and prizes 

In 1975 Pita won first prize for Latin American poetry from the Institute of Hispanic culture in Malaga, Spain. Since then she has published over two dozen titles, first under the seal of Ediciones Solar, "itinerant editorial" (in the words of Octavio Paz) which she co-founded with David Lagmanovich and sustained for ten years with over 26 books of poetry published by twelve different authors. In 1981 she gave a lecture and reading tour to several universities in Germany and traveled to Caracas as a special guest of the II Congress of Writers in Spanish Language. Her poetry has been widely studied, partly translated to seven languages; mostly to English and Italian; and included in international anthologies such as Poetisch Rebellieren (Kassel: Werkstatt Verlag, 1981); New Directions in Prose and Poetry 49 (New York: New Directions Books, 1985), translated by Donald D.Walsh; A Century of Cuban Writers in Florida. (Pineapple Press: Sarasota, 1996), Doscientos años de poesía cubana/ 1770-1990/ Cien poemas antológicos (La Habana, 1999), La pérdida y el sueño (Ed. Término, 2001);  Poesía cubana del siglo XX (México: FCE, 2002); Breve polifonía hispanoamericana (Chile, 2005); Otra Cuba secreta (Madrid: Verbum, 2012); Catedral sumergida (La Habana: Letras Cubanas, 2013), among others.

Juana Rosa Pita travels frequently to Italy, and also writes and publishes poetry in Italian. In 1985 she was awarded the VIII Premio Pisa Internazionale Ultimo Novecento in the section 'Poeti nel mondo "("it is so significant for Italian literature at the beginning of the century the life force of her poetry composed with an exemplary harmony, brilliant, concise and new, because it pursues no balancing of fashion, but springs from an expressive sensitivity orchestrated with an original rhythm "). Two years later in 1987 she was awarded the 'Culture for Peace' Premio Alghero. On both occasions she was guest of honor at the Congress of Poets and Critics  held in Sardinia, Italy. In 1993 she received the poetry award ‘Letras de Oro’ of the Iberian Studies Institute  in Coral Gables. More recently she participated as a special guest in the congresses of the Università degli Studi di Firenze "La parola stuadiata e creata" - Celebration of Hispanicism, and "Cuba dentro e fuori" - Cuban literature of the XIX and XX centuries (May 2007 and May 2008, respectively).

She has edited and prologued works such as the second edition of El pan de los muertos and the first edition of Cartas à la carte, both by Enrique Labrador Ruiz.

Her poems, essays and articles can be found in publications in America and Europe, from La prensa literaria in Managua and Vuelta in Mexico to Cuadernos del Matemático,  Alhucema  and Diario de Cuba, from Spain. She has translated several works from the Italian, including essays by Paolo Spinicci and Miguel de Unamuno, as well as poems by Antonia Pozzi and Valerio Magrelli.

Two Latin American composers have created, with some of her poems, art songs and other compositions: Cartas Interdimensionales by German Cáceres and "Epigramas" by Diana Arismendi.

An anthology of her work, Antología poética (1975-2018), was selected and introduced by Alexander Pérez-Heredia and published by Editorial Verbum (Madrid: 2019). A comprehensive selection of her poetry from 2010-2019 was translated by Erin Goodman and published by Song Bridge Press in The Miracle Unfolds (Iowa City: 2021).

Work

Poetry collections 

 Pan de sol. Washington: Ediciones Solar, 1976
 Las cartas y las horas. Washington: Solar, 1977
 Mar entre rejas. Washington: Solar, 1977
 Tránsito. Separata/ Papeles de Son Armadans, Madrid-Palma de Mallorca, 1978
 El arca de los sueños. Washington-Buenos Aires: Solar, 1978
 Manual de magia. Barcelona: Editorial Ambito Literario (accésit del premio de poesía en la II Bienal de1978), 1979. 
 Vallejiana. En Antología Solar. Miami: Solar, 1979
 Eurídice en la fuente. Miami: Solar, 1979
 Viajes de Penélope. Prólogo de Reinaldo Arenas. Miami: Solar, 1980. 
 Crónicas del Caribe. Miami: Solar, 1983
 El sol tatuado. Boston: Solar, 1986
 Arie etrusche/ Aires etruscos. Prefacio y traducción al italiano de Pietro Civitareale. Cagliari: GIA Editrice, 1987
 Plaza sitiada. Prólogo de Pablo Antonio Cuadra. Costa Rica: Libro Libre (primer volumen de la Colección -- ‘Poesía en Exilio’), 1987
 Sorbos de luz/ Sips of Light. Traducción al inglés de Mario de Salvatierra. New Orleans-San Francisco: Eboli Poetry Series, 1990
 Proyecto de infinito (plegable). New Orleans: Edizione di Amatori, 1991
 Sorbos venecianos/ Sorsi veneziani/ Venetian Sips. (50 en edición artesanal) 1992
 Florencia nuestra/ Biografía poemática. Finalista del premio de poesía ‘Juan Boscán’ de Barcelona, 1980-81/ Miami-Valencia: Arcos, 1992
 Transfiguración de la armonía. Coral Gables: La Torre de Papel, 1993
 Una estación en tren. Premio ‘Letras de Oro’ de Poesía 1992-93. University of Miami: North South Center, Iberian Studies Institute 1994
 Infancia del Pan nuestro. Boston: Poetry Planting, 1995
 Tela de concierto. Miami: El Zunzún Viajero, 1999/ Pórtico de Jesús J.Barquet
 Cadenze/ Poesie. Collana di Poesia Il Capricornio, Foggia: Bastogi Editrice Italiana, 2000/ Prefazione, Pietro Civitareale/ Nota de contratapa, Maria Grazia Lenisa
 Claves de siglo nuevo. Artes y Letras, Managua, 27 octubre 2001/ Aforismos 
 Cartas y cantigas. Separata de Betania, Madrid 27 de junio de 2003 
 Pensamiento del tiempo. Miami: Amatori, 2005
 Nido de soles. Amatori, Boston 2008 / Plegable con 12 poemas
 Sorbos de luz alineados. Cuadernos del Matemático, Núm.41-42, pp. 45–47
 Meditati. Udine: Campanotto Ed., Collana Internazionale, 2010 / edición bilingüe
 Soul Alphabet. Boston, 2012
 El ángel sonriente/ L ́angelo sorridente. Prefacio: Jorge De Arco. Amatori, 2013
 Puentes y plegarias/ Ponti e preghiere. El Zunzún Viajero: Boston, 2015
 Legendario Entanglement/ Leggendario Entanglement. Amatori, 2016
 Se desata el milagro / Si scatena il miracolo. Amatori, 2016
 Bosco del cuore rinascente / Bosque del corazón renaciente. El Zunzún Viajero: Boston, 2018
 Imaginando la verdad. Amatori, 2019

Anthologies 

 Grumo d’alba. Plaquette in Spanish and Italian. Pisa: Giardini Editori, 1985 
 Cantar de Isla. La Habana: Letras Cubanas, Poesía/Selección y prólogo Virgilio López Lemus, 2003
 Antología poética (1975-2018). Selección y prólogo: Alexander Pérez-Heredia. Editorial Verbum, 2019

Book translations 

 Viajes de Penélope/ I viaggi di Penelope. Trad. Alessio Brandolini y Prefazione di Martha Canfield ("Viaggiare come sognare come cantare"). Finalista del Premio internazionale di poesia Camaiore 2008. Campanotto Editore: Udine, 2007
 Manuscript in Dreams/ Study of Chopin. Translated by Mario A. Pita.  Amatori, 2010
 Manual de magia/ Manual of Magic. Translated by Donald D. Walsh. Amatori, 2011
 Viajes de Penélope/ Penelope's Journeys. Translated by Mario A. & María I. Pita, 2012
 Smiling Angel. Chapbook. A selection translated by Erin Goodman. Amatori, 2013
 Bridges and Prayers. Chapbook. A selection translated by Erin Goodman. El Zunzún Viajero: Boston, Spring 2015
 Legendary Entanglement. Chapbook. A selection translated by Erin Goodman. El Zunzún Viajero: Boston, Fall 2016
 Se Desata el Milagro. Chapbook. A selection translated by Erin Goodman. El Zunzún Viajero: Boston, Fall 2016
 The Miracle Unfolds. Selected Poetry by Juana Rosa Pita (2010-2019).  Selected and translated by Erin Goodman. Song Bridge Press, 2021

Selected prose 
 Isla de dos Cubanet.org
 Manuscrito en sueños/ Estudio de Chopin. Amatori, Charleston, 2009
 Jorge Ibargüengotia. Revolución en el jardín
 Javier Marías sale en defensa de nuestra lengua
 Enrique Gómez-Correa o La luminosidad del secreto
 The Splendid Legacy of Albert Camus. SOCIETY, Vol. 50 Number 6, Nov-Dec 2013
 Albert Camus: una vida por la verdad
 La utilidad de lo inútil:  alegato a favor de las humanidades
 Octavio Paz: árbol centenario de la poesía
 Roberto Juarroz: La salvación por la mirada/ Le salut par le regard Revista ALBA No. 19, Paris, Junio 2014
 Various articles in Letras Libres
 Un nuevo poemario de Juana Rosa Pita. Diario de Cuba. Pietro Civitareale 9 March 2017.

Education 
 1984 PhD in Hispanic Literature from the Catholic University of America.
 1975 Master's degree from the George Mason University
 1957 ‘Bachiller en Letras’ from Nuestra Señora de Lourdes school in Havana

Personal life 

Parents: Justo P. Padrón from Palmira (Cienfuegos) y Rosa Cabezón from Cárdenas.  From 1960 to 1979 she was married to Mario Pita, and has three children: Maria Isabel, born in Havana, and Lourdes Maria and Mario Alejandro, born in Miami.

References 

 Aguirre, Raúl Gustavo. "Juana R. Pita: llamaradas de sueño". Reseña de El arca de los sueños.  Tucumán, Argentina, La Gaceta, domingo 15 oct.1978: 2
 Arenas, Reinaldo. "Los viajes revelantes de Juana Rosa Pita". Prólogo de Viajes de Penélope. Miami, Ediciones Solar, 1980: 9-11
 Barquet, Jesús J. "Juana Rosa Pita o Penélope reescribe La Odisea". En Escrituras poéticas de una nación/ Dulce María Loynaz, Juana Rosa Pita y  Carlota Caulfield. La Habana, Ediciones Unión, 2000: 55-78 Reseña de Florencia nuestra. Library Journal, Washington (January 1994): 97-98
 Bolaños, Aimée G. "Un fulgor sin fronteras" (pp. 19–20, 32-33), "El tema de Eurídice en Juana Rosa Pita" (pp. 63, 73 a 88) y "La poesía, única forma de lucidez que no desampara la sombra/ Juana Rosa Pita" (Entrevista, pp. 151–157). Poesía insular de signo infinito/ Una lectura de poetas cubanas de la Diáspora. Ed. Betania, Ensayo, Madrid, 2008 "Juana Rosa Pita, el arte de las biografías imaginarias" (Ensayo) Revista Alhucema Julio-Diciembre de 1910, No.24. Granada, España. pp. 124–133
 Campuzano, Luisa. "Tristes tropicales: exilio y mitos clásicos en poetas cubanas de la diáspora". La Gaceta de Cuba, diciembre de 2008 / Cuarta parte final del ensayo dedicado a la poesía de Juana Rosa Pita.
 Canfield, Martha. "Viajar como soñar y como cantar" en Crítica, revista cultural de la Universidad autónoma de Puebla, México, mayo/junio de 2007, No. 121, pp. 48–55
 Caulfield, Carlota. "Ruptura, irreverencia y memoria en la obra de Juana Rosa Pita". Alba de América Revista literaria XV. 28 y 29. ILCH, Buenos Aires (julio 1997): 154-163 "Juana Rosa Pita". Nota en The Latin American Feminist Encyclopedia. Edit. Eva Paulino e Ivonne Vailakisels. Greenwood Press (2002)
 Civitareale, Pietro. "La magica scrittura di Juana Rosa Pita". Il Cagliaritano XVI 2.1988: 58-59 "La necesidad del amor en tiempos de violencia". En torno a Infancia del Pan nuestro. La Prensa Literaria, Managua, 8 noviembre 1997: 3, con dos fotos "El tiempo se piensa en Juana Rosa Pita". Artes y Letras / El Nuevo Herald, Miami, domingo 14 agosto 2005, 4 col., p. 4-E "Los ríos de Juana Rosa Pita desembocan en El ángel sonriente". Artes y Letras/ El Nuevo Herald, 9 de agosto, 2013, p. 4 E. Versión italiana en Capoverso. No. 26, Dicembre 2013.
 Chazarra Montiel, Antonio. Reseña de Mar entre rejas. La Estafeta literaria, Núm. 626, Madrid 15 diciembre 1977
 Poesía de Juana Rosa Pita recibe premio "Ultimo Novecento" de Italia. La Prensa Literaria, Managua, domingo 24 febrero 1985: 2
 Cruz Alvarez, Félix. "La poesía de Juana Rosa Pita". Diario Las Américas 26/2/85: 5
 Cuadra, Pablo Antonio. "Poetas de América/ Juana Rosa Pita/ Viajes de Penélope". Managua, La Prensa Literaria, domingo 12 dic. 1982: 7 y 8, con foto y poemas
 De Arco, Jorge. "Juana Rosa Pita, verso y música". Granada Costa (23 de diciembre de 2009): 50 "Juana Rosa Pita, donde habita el verso". Reseña de Meditati. Prensa Iberoamericana, Madrid, 14 de abril, 2011
 Escobar Galindo, David. "Sorbos de luz de Juana Rosa Pita". La Prensa Gráfica, San Salvador, 24 diciembre 1990: 6 y 7
 Espinosa Domínguez, Carlos. "Constancia y dedicación" y "Retrato de grupo con figura al fondo" en El peregrino en comarca ajena/ Panorama crítico de la literatura cubana del exilio. Univ. of Colorado: SSSAS, 2002 / pp. 45–47 y 123-26  "El segundo viaje de Penélope" en Encuentro de la cultura cubana 45/46, Verano Otoño de 2007 / Buena Letra, Madrid, pp. 81 y 82 "Lo breve, si bueno..." Reseña de Meditati. Encuentro de la cultura cubana- Literatura/ Publicación digital, Madrid, 28 de octubre, 2011
 Giambene, Renata. "Quando la magia de la poesia sposa la Sardegna/ Incontro con Juana Rosa Pita". Il Cagliaritano. Año XV, No. 6, Cagliari, junio 1987: 50 y 51, con foto
 Guerrero, Francisca. "Juana Rosa Pita/ ‘Sin poesía se empobrece la vida’" La Prensa Gráfica, San Salvador, Cultura viernes 27 de junio de 2003: 74 y 75, con foto
 Häsler, Rodolfo. "Juana Rosa Pita o la voluntad de clasicismo". Artículo sobre Cadenze. Linden Lane Magazine, Septiembre 2000
 Lenti, Maria. Sobre El ángel sonriente/ L ́angelo sorridente. Revista literaria Baquiana. Año XV No. 86-87/ Publicación digital, Miami, Estados Unidos XV No. 86-87. 28 de septiembre, 2013 . Versión italiana en Capoverso. No.26, Dec. 2013
 Márquez Rodríguez, Julián. "La palabra y el mar" (Soneto a JRP) y Reseña de Crónicas del Caribe. Revista Manxa, Ciudad Real, España, Núm. 22, julio 1983
 Mendinueta, Lauren. "Peregrinacion a lo esencial: una lectura de Juana Rosa Pita." Al Margen 11 (Colombia, Sept. 2004): 89-91 & Centro Virtual Cervantes/ Rinconete, Oct. 2004
 Pérez-Heredia, Alexander. "Las estancias del ser en la poesia de Juana Rosa Pita." (Ensayo) Cuadernos del Matemático 35 (Dic. 2005): 99-101 "Juana Rosa Pita y su regreso a la casa firme. Una poética peregrina de las letras cubanas". (Ensayo) Poesía hispana en los Estados Unidos. Editora Ana M. Osán. Monografías de ALDEEU, 2011, pp. 105–120
 Plaza, Galvarino. Reseña de Manual de magia. Cuadernos Hispanoamericanos. Núm. 363-362, Madrid, 1980: 422-423
 Redacción. "Premio a Juana Rosa Pita". Revista Vuelta, México, Núm. 100, marzo 1985: 78
 Russotto, Margara. "Vínculos legendarios: los  ́viajes ́ de Juana Rosa Pita" (Ensayo) La Habana elegante. Segunda época. Spring-Summer 2013, No. 53. Revista digital.
 Shiffrin, Nancy. A review of New Directions 49. Los Angeles Times, Mar. 9, 1986
 Tomás, Lourdes. "El poeta del piano como músico de las palabras". Cuadernos del Matemático Año XXII, No. 44, (Madrid, mayo 2010): 103-104
 Stefanoni, Gian Piero. On El angel sonriente/ L’angelo sorridente. Larecherche.it. 21 Nov. 2014

External links 

 Juana Rosa Pita Corral recorded at the Library of Congress for the Hispanic Division’s audio literary archive on April 9, 1984

20th-century Cuban poets
Cuban poets
Cuban women poets
1939 births
Living people
Catholic University of America alumni
George Mason University alumni
21st-century Cuban poets
20th-century Cuban women writers
21st-century Cuban women writers